Peru is a signatory to the Berne Convention, and the basic law on copyright is contained in Legislative Decree No. 822 of April 23, 1996. Related and subsequent amending legislation are listed at the relevant WIPO page.

References

External links
Legislative Decree No. 822 of April 23, 1996 Full text of the law in English.
Legislative Decree No. 822 of April 23, 1996 Full text of the law in Spanish.
Legislative Decree No. 822 of April 23, 1996 Full text of the law in Spanish. (alternate source)

Law of Peru
Peru